Sterling Middle School may refer to:
Sterling Middle School (Quincy, Massachusetts)
Ross Sterling Middle School in Humble, Texas
Sterling Middle School (Sterling, Virginia)